Wangtang is the name of 3 villages in Hunan.

Until the mid-90s this was an actual Wangtang Township, which was then merged into Shuidongjiang Township (which later became Shuidongjiang Town).

References

Geography of Hunan
Villages in China